Mold Alexandra Football Club is a football club based in Mold in Wales. The club was founded in 1929 and played in local amateur leagues before joining the Welsh National League after the Second World War. The team enjoyed success in the 1980s and became a founder member of the League of Wales in 1992. The side were relegated from the division in 1995 and had dropped several tiers by the end of the decade. They now play in the Cymru North which is in the second tier of the Welsh football league system.

The club has played at Alyn Park since they were founded in 1929.

History
Mold Alexandra was formed in 1929. Several teams had previously been established in the town including Mold Town which folded a year after Alexandra was founded. Alexandra joined the Mold, Deeside and Buckley League for the 1930–31 season, playing its first competitive fixture on 30 August 1930, defeating Oakenholt St David's 5–3. The club went on to win the North Wales Junior Cup in its first season and the Flintshire Amateureague in its second.

Alexandra joined the West Cheshire Association Football League in 1937 before joining the Welsh National League Wrexham Area after the Second World War. The club remained in the division for more than 40 years. The 1980s proved to be a successful decade for the club as it won the Welsh National League on two occasions and won several regional cup competitions. As a result, Alexandra were invited to join the newly formed Cymru Alliance in 1990. In its two seasons in the league, Alexandra finished outside the top 10 on both occasions.

In 1992, the League of Wales was formed as the top tier of senior football in Wales. Alexandra was one of the 20 founding members of the league and played its first match against Inter Cardiff, losing 1–0. Alexandra was temporarily suspended from the league after failing to meet ground regulation requirements but the club was able to rectify the problems and were reinstated, finishing the season in 13th position. The club suffered financial difficulties in its following two seasons and were relegated from the League of Wales on the final day of the 1994–95 season after losing 7–3 to Ton Pentre.

The club returned to the Cymru Alliance for three seasons, but were relegated again in 1998. The club chose to drop to Division One of the Wrexham Area League, taking the place of the club's reserve side. Alexandra won promotion to the Premier Division of the regional league in its first season and returned to the Cymru Alliance in 2002. The club spent the following 15 years moving between the Cymru Alliance and the Premier Division of the Wrexham Area League.

Honours
FAW Trophy
Winners: 2021–22
Welsh National League
Champions: 1985–86, 1986–87, 2002–03, 2013–14
League Cup: Winners 1950, 1986
League Cup: Runners-up 2008
Presidents Cup Winners: 2008, 2013–14
North East Wales FA Challenge Cup 
Winners: 1986, 1987, 2015
North Wales Coast Cup
Winners: 1986
North Wales Junior Cup Winners 1930
Ardal Northwest
Champions: 2021–22
North East Wales FA Junior (Horace Wynne) Cup
Runners-up: 2021–22

Source:

See also
:Category:Mold Alexandra F.C. players

References

External links
Official website

Football clubs in Wales
Sport in Flintshire
Association football clubs established in 1929
Welsh National League (Wrexham Area) Premier Division clubs
1929 establishments in Wales
Cymru Premier clubs
Cymru Alliance clubs
Mold, Flintshire
Ardal Leagues clubs
West Cheshire Association Football League clubs
Cymru North clubs